Helicat is a marine vessel designed by Conte Yacht Design. The vessel resembles a helicopter cabin on a pair of pontoons. It looks like a hybrid of a helicopter and catamaran.

References

External links
Helicat website

Boats